The Hawk HF3000 is a kit car based on the Lancia Stratos. It was built by the British automobile company Hawk Cars Ltd.  This type of car can also be referred to as a continuation car or replica.

References 

Kit cars
Rally cars